“Prioni, mobo: srpske izvorne pesme” (English: "Come on, harvest elhelpers: Serbian traditional songs") is the debut album from Moba. It was released on cassette by Belgrade lab “Biljeg - balkansko i slovensko izdavaštvo” in 1994.

Contributors to the album include Jelena Jovanović, Svetlana Spajić, Aleksandra Pavićević, Sanja Stanković, Sanja Radinović and Zvezdana Milović, in cooperation with Darko Macura, as mentor and co-producer.

Track listing 
Side A
  (2,05), harvesters', “per bass”, Ribaševina near Užice 
  (2,30), harvesters', Ribaševina near Užice 
  (2,00) 
  (2,00), Seča Reka near Užice
  (1,20) 
  (4,20), shepherds', Jarmenovci near Topole 
  (3,15) 
  (2,05), harvesters', “per voice”, Crnuća by Rudnik mountain 
  (2,00), harvesters', “per voice”, Valjevska Podgorina

Side B
  (2,55), slavska, from Čerovnica near Kosovska Mitrovica
  (1,50) 
  (2,20), “per voice”, Rastošnica, Drina region
  (1,50), “per bass”, Ribaševina near Užice 
  (1,40), wedding song, around Sokobanja 
  (2,45), Rujište near Boljevac 
  (1,05), wedding song, Ribaševina near Užice
  (3,55), from Manjak near Vranje
  (3,30)

Credits

Performers 
 Jelena Jovanović (А6, B1, B7, follows in А9, B6)  
 Svetlana Spajić (A1, A2, A3, A9, B3, follows in A8, B5)  
 Aleksandra Pavićević (A4, A5, follows in A8, B3, B7)  
 Sanja Stanković (A2, B4, B5, B6, B8)  
 Sanja Radinović (A7, B9,)  
 Zvezdana Milović (A8, B2)

Colophon 
 Publisher: “Biljeg – Balkansko i slovensko izdavaštvo”, Belgrade, 1993 (AK-003)  
 Recorded in studio “Akademija”, Belgrade, April 1994
 Production: “Moba” and Darko Macura
 Recording: Goran Živković  
 Photography: Milinko Stefanović  
 Design: Boban Knežević  
 Recension: Bojan Žikić  
 Director: Milinko Stefanović  
 Editor-in-chief: Zoran Stefanović

References

Literature 
 Matović, Jelena. „'Prioni mobo', kaseta izvornih srpskih pesama u izvođenju ženskog ansambla 'Moba'“ - A review, in: Zbornik Matice srpske za scenske umetnosti i muziku, 16–17, Novi Sad 1995, 280–281.
 Muršič, Rajko. „Darko Macura: Prizivanja, Srpski duvački instrumenti (Biljeg 1994) • Moba: Prioni, Mobo, Izvorne srpske pesme Biljeg, 1994)“, Glasbena mladina, letnik 26, številka 5, Marec 1996, str. 30.
 Jovanović, Jelena. „The Power of Recently Revitalized Serbian Rural Folk Music in Urban Settings“, in: Music, Power, and Politics, ed. by Annie J. Randall, Routledge, 2004. p. 137.

External links 
 Srpske narodne ženske pesme za pevanje (lyrics), priredila Svetlana Spajić, Projekat Rastko 

1994 albums
Svetlana Spajić albums